Ilorin West is a Local Government Area in Kwara State, Nigeria. Its headquarters are in the town of Wara Osin Area.
 
It has an area of 105 km and a population of 364,666 at the 2006 census.

The postal code of the area is 240.

References

Local Government Areas in Kwara State